{{DISPLAYTITLE:C6H7N5O}}
The molecular formula C6H7N5O (molar mass: 165.15 g/mol, exact mass: 165.0651 u) may refer to:

 6-O-Methylguanine
 7-Methylguanine